Anatoma janetae is a species of sea snail, a marine gastropod mollusk in the family Anatomidae.

Description
The shell reaches a height of 3.8 mm.

Distribution
This species occurs in the bathyal zone of Northeast Pacific Ocean.

References

 Geiger D.L. (2006). Eight new species of Scissurellidae and Anatomidae (Mollusca: Gastropoda: Vetigastropoda) from around the world, with discussion of two senior synonyms. Zootaxa 1128:1-33.
 Geiger D.L. (2012) Monograph of the little slit shells. Volume 1. Introduction, Scissurellidae. pp. 1-728. Volume 2. Anatomidae, Larocheidae, Depressizonidae, Sutilizonidae, Temnocinclidae. pp. 729–1291. Santa Barbara Museum of Natural History Monographs Number 7.

External links

Anatomidae
Gastropods described in 2006